Hurt By Paradise is a British comedy-drama film directed by Greta Bellamacina. The film stars Bellamacina as Celeste, a single mother and her unexpected friendship with her babysitter, a middle-aged failed actress. The film was nominated for the prestigious Michael Powell Award for Best British Feature Film and Best Performance at Edinburgh International Film Festival 2019 and for Best UK Feature Film at Raindance Film Festival 2019.

Cast
 Greta Bellamacina as Celeste
Camilla Rutherford as Estelle
 Jaime Winstone as Janette
Nicholas Rowe as Jonathan Birchwood
 Anna Brewster as Tessa
 Jazzy De Lisser as Lori
 Sadie Brown as Stella
Bruno Aleph Wizard as Roman

Filming
Hurt By Paradise was shot in Camden and Soho, London.

Reception

The Evening Standard wrote, "Bellamacina is as precise and bold as Joanna Hogg."

Another Magazine called the film "spellbinding".

Filmotomy said "Bellamacina has it in her to become one of the great contemporary female voices in British cinema."

On review aggregator website Rotten Tomatoes, the film has an approval rating of 80%.

References

2019 comedy-drama films
British comedy-drama films
2010s British films